Kai A. Konrad (born 1961 in Heidelberg) is a German economist with his main research interest in public economics.

Education
Konrad got his university degrees at the University of Heidelberg (Diplom in Economics, 1985) and the Ludwig Maximilian University of Munich (Doctoral degree in economics 1990, and Habilitation 1993).

Career
Konrad had research and teaching positions at the Ludwig Maximilian University of Munich, Bonn, Bergen (Norway) and the University of California at Irvine. He held a chaired Professorship of Economics at the Freie Universität Berlin from 1994 to 2009 and was a director at the WZB Berlin Social Science Center (WZB) from 2001–2009. From 2009–2010 he was a director at the Max Planck Institute for Intellectual Property, Competition and Tax Law and since 2011 he is a director at the Max Planck Institute for Tax Law and Public Finance .

Konrad was a co-editor (2007-2018) of the Journal of Public Economics. He was a managing editor of Economic Policy and a co-founding editor of Economics of Governance. He is on the editorial boards of several other international journals in Economics and Political Science. He served as an advisor to governments and is the Chairman of the Council of Scientific Advisors to the Federal Ministry of Finance.

His main fields of current and future research interests are in public economics, microeconomic theory and political economy. He published more than 80 papers in economics, political sciences, law, and management in international journals in such as the Economic Journal, American Economic Review, Games and Economic Behavior, Journal of Public Economics, Journal of International Economics, Journal of Conflict Resolution, Journal of Theoretical Politics, and Management Science.

Since 2012 Konrad has been a member of the German Academy of Science and Engineering (acatech). In 2013 Konrad was admitted to the Academy of Sciences Leopoldina (Deutsche Akademie der Naturforscher Leopoldina) and the Academia Europaea, in 2014 to the Berlin-Brandenburg Academy of Sciences and Humanities (Berlin-Brandenburgische Akademie der Wissenschaften) and 2015 to the European Academy of Sciences and Arts (Europäische Akademie der Wissenschaften und Künste).

Other activities

Scientific organizations
 Leibniz Centre for European Economic Research (ZEW), Chair of the Scientific Advisory Council (since 2017), Member of the Scientific Advisory Board (since 2000)
 Kiel Institute for the World Economy (IfW), Member of the Scientific Advisory Board (since 2014)
 Norwegian Center for Taxation (NoCeT) at the Norwegian School of Economics, Member of the Scientific Advisory Board (since 2012)
 Econwatch, Member of the Board of Trustees (since 2012)
 Bruegel, Member of the Scientific Council (2012-2017)
 Munich Center of Governance, Communication, Public Policy and Law (MCG), Member of the Scientific Advisory Board (2009-2012)

Editorial boards
 German Economic Review, Member of the Board of Editors (since 2012)
 Wirtschaftsdienst, Member of the Scientific Advisory Board (since 2011)
 World Tax Journal, Member of the Board of Editors (since 2010)
 Journal of Conflict Resolution, Member of the Board of Editors (since 2009)
 Economics of Governance, Associate Editor (since 2008)
 Journal of Public Economics, Co-Editor (2007-2018)
 Journal of Population Economics, Associate Editor (since 2001)

References

External links
 
 Kai A. Konrad at the Max Planck Institute for Tax Law and Public Finance
 Kai A. Konrad at the Academia Europaea
 Kai A. Konrad at the Berlin-Brandenburg Academy of Sciences and Humanities, BBAW
 Kai A. Konrad at the Academy of Sciences Leopoldina
 Kai A. Konrad at acatech

1961 births
Living people
German economists
Heidelberg University alumni
Ludwig Maximilian University of Munich alumni
Academic staff of the European School of Management and Technology
Max Planck Institute directors